The 2006 Cal Poly Mustangs football team represented California Polytechnic State University during the 2006 NCAA Division I FCS football season.

Cal Poly competed in the Great West Football Conference (GWFC). The Mustangs were led by sixth-year head coach Rich Ellerson and played home games at Mustang Stadium in San Luis Obispo, California. The team finished the season with a record of seven wins and four losses (7–4, 2–2 GWFC). The Mustangs outscored their opponents 248–162 for the season.

Schedule

Team players in the NFL
The following Cal Poly Mustang players were selected in the 2007 NFL Draft.

Notes

References

Cal Poly
Cal Poly Mustangs football seasons
Cal Poly Mustangs football